M. Zuhair Nashed (born May 14, 1936 in Aleppo, Syria) is an American mathematician, working on integral and operator equations, inverse and ill-posed problems, numerical and nonlinear functional analysis, optimization and approximation theory, operator theory, optimal control theory, signal analysis, and signal processing.

Career
Zuhair Nashed received his Master of Science degree in electrical engineering from Massachusetts Institute of Technology in  1958, and his  Doctor of Philosophy degree in mathematics, from the University of Michigan Ann Arbor in 1963.

He started his academic career in 1963 as an assistant professor at Georgia Institute of Technology, Atlanta, and was promoted to associate professor in 1965 and to full professor in 1969. He moved to the University of Delaware in 1977 to hold the position of Professor of mathematics and electrical engineering. He moved to the University Central Florida, Orlando, in 2002, where he held the position of Professor and Chair 2002 – 2006. Since 2007 he is a Professor  at  the University Central Florida, Orlando.

In 2012 he was inducted Fellow of the American Mathematical Society.

References

1936 births
Living people
People from Aleppo
Syrian mathematicians
Syrian emigrants to the United States
Fellows of the American Mathematical Society
20th-century American mathematicians
University of Michigan alumni
21st-century American mathematicians